Dyrosaurus is a genus of extinct crocodylomorph that lived during the early Eocene. The name Dyrosaurus comes from  the Greek for lizard or reptile, and Dyr for Djebel Dyr (mountain) close to where the type species was discovered.

Species 
Although the family Dyrosauridae is quite diverse and contains a variety of species, the genus Dyrosaurus has only two described species: D. phosphaticus and D. maghribensis. D. phosphaticus was first discovered in Algeria and Tunisia whereas D. maghribensis has only been found in Morocco. D. maghribensis differs from D. phosphaticus by several synapomorphies, most notably: a smooth dorsal margin of the parietal and widely opened choanae, interfenestral bar wide and strongly T-shaped instead of moderately T-shaped. In D. maghribensis the lateral and medial dorsal osteoderms are not sutured and have no serrated margin. The anterolateral margin of medial row of the dorsal osteoderms have a rounded lateral lobe and the lateral row of dorsal osteoderms are square in shape with rounded corners. In D. phosphaticus there are  four longitudinal rows of square osteoderms that are thin and have shallow and wide pits. The osteoderms are square and the anterolateral margin of the medial dorsal osteoderms have an acute rounded process directed laterally. Dyrosaurus have been inferred to have been ectothermic on the basis of bone histology and stable isotope analysis.

History of discovery 

 
French paleontologist Auguste Pomel named the genus Dyrosaurus in 1894 for Djebel Dyr, a mountain near Tebessa in Algeria where its fossilized vertebrae were found in a phosphate mine. The holotype named MNHN 1901-11 includes one tooth, one caudal vertebra, one distal extremity of an ulna and one distal extremity of a radius. The first remains of Dyrosaurus were named Crocodilus phosphaticus by Thomas (1893) for Early Eocene crocodyliform remains from Gafsa, Tunisia. Pomel eventually synonymized the type species D. thevestensis with C. phosphaticus to form the new combination D. phosphaticus, making phosphaticus the epithet of the Dyrosaurus type species. In 1903, the family Dyrosauridae was named by Giuseppe de Stefano referring to the locality for the holotype was found in Djebel Dyr, Algeria. Thévenin (1911a, 1911b), with some better preserved material, recognized that Dyrosaurus phosphaticus was a Lower Eocene crocodyliform. Many dyrosaurid remains are known, but unfortunately they are often poorly preserved which makes it difficult for paleontologists to get a strong understanding of the family.

References

Dyrosaurids
Prehistoric pseudosuchian genera
Prehistoric marine crocodylomorphs
Eocene crocodylomorphs
Eocene animals of Africa
Taxa named by Auguste Pomel